Frontiers in Zoology is a peer-reviewed open access scientific journal covering all aspects of zoology. The editors-in-chief are 
Jürgen Heinze (University of Regensburg) and Ulrich Technau (University of Vienna).

Abstracting and indexing
The journal is abstracted and indexed in:

According to the Journal Citation Reports, the journal has a 2016 impact factor of 2.781.

References

External links

Zoology journals
Publications established in 2004
Creative Commons Attribution-licensed journals
English-language journals
BioMed Central academic journals